Sidney Park Colored Methodist Episcopal Church, also known as Sidney Park Christian Methodist Episcopal Church, is a historic Methodist Episcopal church located at Columbia, South Carolina. It was built in 1893, and is a brick Late Gothic Revival style church.  It features the only set of octagonal towers in Columbia; each is topped by an octagonal steeple.  The church also has lancet windows and pointed arches, wall buttresses, and a heavy timber truss system. The African-American congregation has a long history of involvement with civil rights activity and connection with the NAACP.

It was added to the National Register of Historic Places in 1996.

References

External links

African-American history of South Carolina
Churches on the National Register of Historic Places in South Carolina
Churches completed in 1893
Churches in Columbia, South Carolina
National Register of Historic Places in Columbia, South Carolina